Anthony Shey Tarke (born May 27, 1998) is an American professional basketball player for the Maine Celtics of the NBA G League. He played college basketball player for the Coppin State Eagles. He was named the MEAC Player of the Year for the 2020–21 season.

College career
Tarke attended Gaithersburg High School and was named to the All-Met team by the Washington Post. After a prep season at Coastal Academy in New Jersey, he committed to play college basketball at the New Jersey Institute of Technology (NJIT). He had a successful start to his career, averaging 9.9 points and 4.7 rebounds per game, earning ASUN Conference all-freshman team honors. He followed this up by moving full time into the Highlanders' starting lineup, improving his averages to 15.7 points and 6.2 rebounds per game and was named to the first-team All-Atlantic Sun. Following this season, Tarke decided to transfer to a program that would provide a higher level of competition, choosing the University of Texas at El Paso (UTEP). After sitting out the 2018–19 season, he played one season for the Miners, but found playing time inconsistent. He chose to enter the transfer portal again, this time as an immediately-eligible graduate transfer.

Tarke chose Coppin State and head coach Juan Dixon for his final year of eligibility. On the season, he averaged 16.4 points, 8.4 rebounds and 3.7 assists per game for the Eagles, who went on to win a share of the MEAC North division regular season title. At the close of the season, Tarke was named the MEAC Player of the Year and Defensive Player of the Year.

Professional career

Motor City Cruise (2021–2022)
After going undrafted in the 2021 NBA draft, Tarke signed a training camp contract with the Detroit Pistons, but was waived on September 27. Tarke was added to their G League affiliate, the Motor City Cruise in October 2021.

Santa Cruz Warriors (2023)
On February 15, 2023, Tarke was acquired by the Santa Cruz Warriors. On February 27, 2023, Tarke was waived.

Maine Celtics (2023–present)
On March 8, 2023, Tarke was acquired by the Maine Celtics.

References

External links
Coppin State Eagles bio
UTEP Miners bio
NJIT Highlanders bio
College stats @ sports-reference.com

1998 births
Living people
American men's basketball players
Basketball players from Washington, D.C.
Coppin State Eagles men's basketball players
Gaithersburg High School alumni
Motor City Cruise players
NJIT Highlanders men's basketball players
Santa Cruz Warriors players
Shooting guards
UTEP Miners men's basketball players